Christian Johan Barnard (15 July 1939 – 28 December 2015), known as Chris Barnard, was a South African author and movie scriptwriter.  He was known for writing Afrikaans novels, novellas, columns, youth novels, short stories, plays, radio dramas, film scripts and television dramas.

Biography
He majored in Afrikaans-Nederlands and History of Art at the University of Pretoria.

In the 1960s he and several other authors were notable figures in the Afrikaans literary movement known as Die Sestigers ("The Sixty-ers"). These writers sought to use Afrikaans as a language to speak against the apartheid government, and also to bring into Afrikaans literature the influence of contemporary English and French trends.

During 1962 Barnard married his first wife, Anette, and together they produced three sons; Johan, Stephan and Tian. After divorcing his first wife in 1978, he married his second wife, Katinka Heyns. His fourth son, Simon, is born out of this marriage.

Barnard's second novel, Mahala, is considered an Afrikaans classic. He died on 28 December 2015 of a heart attack.

Works

Prose 

Bekende onrus; novel (1961)
Die houtbeeld; novella (1961)
Boela van die blouwater; youth novel (1962)
Man in die middel; novel (1963)
Dwaal; novella (1964)
Die swanesang van majoor Sommer; novella (1965)
Duiwel-in-die-bos; short stories (1968)
Mahala; novel (1971)
Chriskras; short stories and sketches (1972)
Danda; youth novel (1974)
Chriskras: 'n tweede keur; short stories and sketches (1976)
Danda op Oudeur; youth novel (1977)
So onder deur die maan: Chriskras 3; short stories and sketches (1985)
Voetpad na Vergelegen; youth novel (1987)
Klopdisselboom – die beste van Chriskras; short stories and sketches (1988)
Moerland; novel (1992)
Boendoe; novel (1999)
Oulap se blou; short stories (2008)

Plays and radio dramas
Pa, maak vir my 'n vlieër, Pa; (1964)
'n Stasie in die niet; (1970)
Die rebellie van Lafras Verwey; (1971)
Iemand om voor nag te sê; (1975)
Op die pad na Acapulco; (1975)
'n Man met vakansie; (1977)
Taraboemdery; (1977)

Television and filmscripts
Die Transvaalse Laeveld: kamee van 'n kontrei; (1975)
Piet-my-vrou & Nagspel; (1982)
Bartho by geleentheid van sy sestigste verjaardag; (1984)
Die storie van Klara Viljee; compiler and editor (1992)
Paljas; compiler and editor (1998)

Translated works
Boela van die blouwater translated into Dutch by Dieuwke Behrens
Pa, maak vir my 'n vlieër, Pa translated into English by the author
Die rebellie van Lafras Verwey translated into Dutch, French, English, Italian and Czech
Mahala translated into German by Griet van Schreven, and English by Luzette Strauss

Awards and honours
1961 CNA Prize; Bekende onrus 
1962 APB Prize for youth literature; Boela van die blouwater 
1968 CNA Prize; Duiwel-in-die-bos 
1970 SABC/BRT Prize for radio dramas; Die rebellie van Lafras Verwey 
1973 Hertzog Prize for prose; Mahala and Duiwel-in-die-bos 
1973 SABC Academy Prize for radio dramas; Die rebellie van Lafras Verwey 
1974 WA Hofmeyr Prize; Mahala 
1980 Idem Prize for radio dramas; Die rebellie van Lafras Verwey 
1984 Idem Prize for television dramas; Donkerhoek 
1986 FAK-Helpmekaar Prize for light fiction; So onder deur die maan: Chriskras 3 
1987 Idem Prize for radio dramas; Uitnodiging tot die dans 
1987–89 Scheepers Prize for youth literature; Voetpad na Vergelegen 
1991 Hertzog Prize for drama; For his complete drama oeuvre 
1992 WA Hofmeyr Prize; Moerland 
1993 Rapport Prize; Moerland 
1993 CNA Prize; Moerland 
2006 ATKVeertjie for writer of episode 13 of Amalia 
2008 SA Akademie's Medal of Honour for Afrikaans Radio Dramas; Blindemol 
2013 Independent Foreign Fiction Prize, shortlisted for Bundu (tr. Michiel Heyns; Afrikaans)

References

External links

NB Publishers Author profile
Umuzi Randomhouse Author profile
Star.co.za The top of the heap – August 2006, Chris Barnard and Katinka Heyns at the Aardklop Festival
KKNK – soul food for theatregoers – February 2007, Chris Barnard's Twaalfuurwals features at the 2007 KKNK
iafrica.com KKNK's sweet sixteen – February 2010, Chris Barnard features Taraboemdery at the 2010 KKNK

1939 births
2015 deaths
South African writers
Afrikaner anti-apartheid activists
Afrikaner people
Afrikaans-language poets
Afrikaans-language writers
Sestigers
University of Pretoria alumni
Hertzog Prize winners for drama
Hertzog Prize winners for prose
20th-century South African writers
21st-century South African writers
South African male short story writers
South African short story writers
20th-century South African male writers